The Libra Foundation is among the largest charitable organizations in the state of Maine. Major projects include Pineland Farms, the Maine Winter Sports Center, and The MaineHealth Raising Readers program.  The October Corporation is an affiliated organization with real estate holdings on behalf of the Libra Foundation.

References

Charities based in Maine
Organizations established in 1989
Organizations based in Portland, Maine
Community foundations based in the United States